Atanas Gerov (born 1945) is a Bulgarian footballer. He was born in Kyustendil. He competed at the 1968 Summer Olympics in Mexico City, where he won a silver medal with the Bulgarian team.

References

1945 births
Living people
Bulgarian footballers
Bulgaria international footballers
First Professional Football League (Bulgaria) players
FC Septemvri Sofia players
FC Lokomotiv 1929 Sofia players
PFC Slavia Sofia players
Olympic footballers of Bulgaria
Footballers at the 1968 Summer Olympics
Olympic silver medalists for Bulgaria
Olympic medalists in football
People from Kyustendil
Medalists at the 1968 Summer Olympics
Association football defenders
Sportspeople from Kyustendil Province